Greg Meehan is an American swimming coach, as well as the women's head coach for the Stanford swim team. In 2016, Meehan was selected to be an assistant coach for the US Women's Olympic Swimming Team. Meehan coached Katie Ledecky, Maya DiRado, Simone Manuel, and Lia Neal to eleven gold medals, seven silver medals, and two bronze medals. He formerly served as an associate head coach at the University of California, Berkeley (also called Cal). Prior to Cal, Meehan was the men's and women's head coach at University of the Pacific. As a collegiate athlete, Meehan swam at Rider University, in New Jersey, as a backstroker.

In 2018, Meehan was announced as the head coach for women on the 2020 US Olympic Swim Team. The women's team had a total of 35 members including pool and open water swimmers. He had five assistant coaches as part of his coaching team for the Olympic Games, there were a total of eight assistant coaches for both men and women. Under his coaching guidance, the women achieved 18 total Olympic medals at the 2020 Summer Olympics in Tokyo, Japan in July and August 2021, including three gold medals.

For the 2022 World Aquatics Championships, Meehan was one of five assistant coaches selected to the coaching squad for pool swimmers at the Championships.

Awards and honors
 Golden Goggle Award, Coach of the Year: 2017, 2018
 Pac-12 Conference, Coach of the Year (for women's swimming): 2022
 Rider University, Rider Broncs, Hall of Fame: 2017 inductee
 SwimSwam, Swammy Award, United States Coach of the Year: 2019

References

Year of birth missing (living people)
Living people
American swimming coaches